Sam Rosen may refer to:
 Sam Rosen, a character in the Tom Clancy novel Without Remorse
 Sam Rosen (actor)
 Sam Rosen (comics) (died 1992), American comics letterer
 Sam Rosen (sportscaster) (born 1947), American sportscaster